Colwellia aestuarii is a Gram-negative and motile bacterium from the genus of Colwellia which has been isolated from tidal flat sediments from Korea.

References

 

Alteromonadales
Bacteria described in 2006